DWNE (900 AM) is a radio station owned and operated by the Government of Nueva Ecija. The station's studio and transmitter are located in Brgy. Singalat, Palayan. It serves as a community radio station of Nueva Ecija.

Since 2017, select programs can be seen on TV48 under the DWNE Teleradyo block.

References

News and talk radio stations in the Philippines
Radio stations established in 1995
Radio stations in Nueva Ecija